Senator Laughlin may refer to:

Dan Laughlin (fl. 2010s), Pennsylvania State Senate
Edward E. Laughlin (1887–1952), Illinois State Senate
Gail Laughlin (1868–1952), Maine State Senate
John Laughlin (New York politician) (1856–1905), New York State Senate